Ceres Arena (formerly NRGi Arena) is an indoor arena mainly used for handball matches and public events in Aarhus, Denmark. The arena was opened in 2001 and has a capacity of 5,001 spectators (4,394 seats). It is part of the Aarhus Sports Park, which also includes Aarhus Stadium.

Ceres Arena is home to Danish Women's Handball League team Aarhus United and Danish Men's Handball League team Skanderborg Aarhus Håndbold. The arena functioned as the main venue in the 2002 European Women's Championships, hosting the final. The arena was also used for basketball, by Bakken Bears, but because of the high price for renting the arena, Bakken Bears moved back to there old home Vejlby-Risskov Hallen. Since, it has only played selected games in the arena, including some European appearances.

In non-sports, the 2004 Danish Song Contest was held in this arena. The Danish women national handball team also play some matches.

References

External links 
 

Marselisborg
Stadiums in Denmark
Indoor arenas in Denmark
Handball venues in Denmark
Sport in Aarhus
Buildings and structures in Aarhus